The Cleveland Cinematheque is an alternative film theatre located in Cleveland, Ohio. Founded in 1984, it is a part of the Cleveland Institute of Art. It releases a film schedule every other month.

References

External links
Cleveland Cinematheque

Cinemas and movie theaters in Ohio
University Circle
Cleveland Institute of Art
Cinema of Cleveland